Trinity Way tram stop is a tram stop just off the A4031 (Trinity Way) in West Bromwich in the West Midlands, England. It was opened on 31 May 1999 and is situated on West Midlands Metro Line 1.

Services
Mondays to Fridays, Midland Metro services in each direction between Birmingham and Wolverhampton run at six to eight-minute intervals during the day, and at fifteen-minute intervals during the evenings and on Sundays. They run at eight minute intervals on Saturdays.

References

 This stop's entry at thetrams.co.uk

West Midlands Metro stops
Transport in Sandwell
West Bromwich
Railway stations in Great Britain opened in 1999